Abbigere  is a village in the southern state of Karnataka, India. It is located in the Bangalore North taluk of Bangalore district in Karnataka.

References

Villages in Bangalore Urban district